Hollókő is a Palóc ethnographic village in Hungary and a UNESCO World Heritage Site. Its name means "Raven-stone" in Hungarian.

Location 
The village is located in Nógrád county, approximately 91.1 kilometres northeast from Budapest, the capital of Hungary. It lies in a valley of Cserhát Mountains, surrounded by low peaks. The natural environment is protected.

History 
In the middle of the 13th century, in the aftermath of the Mongol invasion, construction of Hollókő castle first began as a means to protect the area against future attacks. At this time, the area around Hollókő was held by the Kacsics noble clan. The castle was first mentioned in records in 1310. The original village was built just below the castle walls. The Ottomans captured the castle in 1552 and for the next 150 years, control alternated between Ottoman and Hungarian forces. At the end of the Ottoman era (1683) the castle and the village were finally abandoned and the present village grew up below. Many of the existing houses were first built around this time. The houses, which contain wood in their structure, have had to be rebuilt many times throughout the years due to periodic fires, the last being in 1909. In 1987, the village, castle ruins, and surrounding area were inscribed as a UNESCO World Heritage Site.

Sights 
 The protected part of the village – Lajos Kossuth and Sándor Petőfi streets, 67 houses
 Village Museum
 Post Museum
 Doll Museum
 Craft Printing Museum
 Hungarian Folk Dance House
 Basket Shop
 Arts & Tea House
 Paloc PlayHouse
 Borpatika
 The House Of The Weavers
 St. Martin Roman Catholic church
 Hollókő castle
 School Master’s House (Oskolamester háza)

Picture gallery

References

External links 

 Aerial photography: Hollókő
 Best Things to do in Holloko, Hungary - Asiana Circus
 History, pictures and google map of Hollókő Castle

Populated places in Nógrád County
World Heritage Sites in Hungary
Tourist attractions in Nógrád County